Öznur Serçeler (born 10 October 1987) is a Turkish actress. She is known for her performance as Leyla Aydın in Erkenci Kuş.

Life and career 
Serçeler was born on 10 October 1987 in Kayseri. She started her studies in music in 2001 at Mersin University Conservatory. She continued her studies in music and stage arts in 2003 at Bilkent University. In 2007, she participated in the Global Youth Orchestra program and performed in Berlin, Kasel and Bodrum. In the same year, she competed in the Elite Model Look contest.

Serçeler first became noted by her performance in the drama series Hayat Devam Ediyor, directed by Mahsun Kırmızıgül. She then appeared alongside Sarp Apak in the movie Karışık Kaset. Her first leading role was in the series Aşkın Kanunu in 2014. In 2017, she played the role of Fatoş in the TV series Dolunay. Between 2018 and 2019, she had a recurring role in the romantic comedy series Erkenci Kuş, in which she portrayed the character of Leyla.

Filmography

References

External links

1987 births
Turkish television actresses
Turkish film actresses
Living people
People from Kayseri